Komori Dam is a gravity dam located in Gunma Prefecture in Japan. The dam is used for power production. The catchment area of the dam is 406 km2. The dam impounds about 10  ha of land when full and can store 855 thousand cubic meters of water. The construction of the dam was started on 1956 and completed in 1958.

References

Dams in Gunma Prefecture